This is the attack on Pearl Harbor's order of battle for both the Empire of Japan and the United States.

Imperial Japanese Navy
Naval General Staff—Admiral Osami Nagano

Combined Fleet 
Admiral Isoroku Yamamoto
First Air Fleet 
Vice Admiral Chuichi Nagumo
1st Carrier Division
Vice Admiral Nagumo
Akagi (flag)—Captain Kiichi Hasegawa
Air Officer—Commander Shogo Masuda
VTB Leader—Commander Mitsuo Fuchida
1st Chutai (5x B5N2 "Kate")—Commander Fuchida
2nd Chutai (5xB5N)-Lieutenant Goro Iwasaki
3rd Chutai (5xB5N)-Lieutenant Izumi Furukawa
VT Leader—Lieutenant Commander Shigeharu Murata
1st Shotai (3xB5N)-Lieutenant Commander Murata
2nd Shotai (3xB5N)
3rd Shotai (3xB5N)-Lieutenant Asao Negishi
4th Shotai (3xB5N)
VB Leader—Lieutenant Takehiko Chihaya
21st Shotai (3xD3A1 "Val")—Lieutenant Chihaya
22nd Shotai (3xD3A)
23rd Shotai (3xD3A) (3 aircraft lost)
25th Shotai (3xD3A)-Lieutenant Zenji Abe (one aircraft lost)
26th Shotai (3xD3A)
27th Shotai (3xD3A)
VF Leader—Lieutenant Commander Shigeru Itaya
1st FCU Wave 1 (9xA6M2 "Zero")—Lieutenant Commander Itaya (one aircraft lost)
1st FCU Wave 2 (9xA6M)—Lieutenant Saburo Shindo
CAP (3xA6M)
Kaga—Captain Jisaku Okada Air Officer—Commander Naohito Sato
VTB Leader—Lieutenant Commander Takashi Hashiguchi
1st Chutai (5xB5N)—Lieutenant Commander Hashiguchi
2nd Chutai (5xB5N)-Lieutenant Hideo Maki
3rd Chutai (4xB5N)-Lieutenant Yoshitaka Mikami
VT Leader—Lieutenant Ichiro Kitajima
1st Shotai (3xB5N)—Lieutenant Kitajima (one aircraft lost)
2nd Shotai (3xB5N) (one aircraft lost)
3rd Shotai (3xB5N)-Lieutenant Mimori Suzuki (two aircraft lost)
4th Shotai (3xB5N) (one aircraft lost)
VB Leader—Lieutenant Saburo Makino
21st Shotai (2 D3A)—Lieutenant Makino (one aircraft lost)
22nd Shotai (3 D3A)
23rd Shotai (3 D3A) (one aircraft lost)
24th Shotai (3 D3A)-Lieutenant Shoichi Ogawa (two aircraft lost)
25th Shotai (3 D3A)
26th Shotai (3 D3A)
27th Shotai (3 D3A)-Lieutenant Shoichi Ibuki (one aircraft lost)
28th Shotai (3 D3A) (one aircraft lost)
29th Shotai (3 D3A)
VF Leader—Lieutenant Yoshio Shiga
2nd FCU Wave 1 (9xA6M)—Lieutenant Shiga (two aircraft lost)
2nd FCU Wave 2 (9xA6M)—Lieutenant Yasushi Nikaido (two aircraft lost)
CAP (3xA6M)2nd Carrier DivisionRear Admiral Tamon YamaguchiSōryū—Captain Ryusaku Yanagimoto Air Officer—Commander Ikuto Kusumoto
VTB Leader—Lieutenant Heijiro Abe
1st Chutai (5xB5N)—Lieutenant Abe
2nd Chutai (5xB5N)-Lieutenant Sadao Yamamoto
VT Leader—Lieutenant Tsuyoshi Nagai
1st Shotai (2xB5N)—Lieutenant Nagai
2nd Shotai (2xB5N)
3rd Shotai (2xB5N)-Lieutenant Tatsumi Nakajima
4th Shotai (2xB5N)
VB Leader—Lieutenant Commander Takashige Egusa
21st Shotai (3xD3A)—Lieutenant Commander Egusa (one aircraft lost)
22nd Shotai (3xD3A) (one aircraft lost)
23rd Shotai (3xD3A)
24th Shotai (3xD3A)-Lieutenant Masai Ikeda
25th Shotai (2xD3A)
26th Shotai (3xD3A)
VF-Leader—Lieutenant Masaji Suganami
3rd FCU Wave 1 (8xA6M)—Lieutenant Suganami
3rd FCU Wave 2 (9xA6M)—Lieutenant Fusata Iida (three aircraft lost)
CAP (3xA6M)Hiryū—Captain Tomeo Kaku Air Officer—Commander Takahisa Amagai
VTB Leader—Lieutenant Commander Tadashi Kusumi
1st Chutai (5xB5N)—Lieutenant Commander Kusumi
2nd Chutai (5xB5N2 "Kate")-Lieutenant Toshio Hashimoto
VT Leader—Lieutenant Heita Matsumura
1st Shotai (2xB5N)—Lieutenant Matsumura
2nd Shotai (2xB5N)
3rd Shotai (2xB5N)-Lieutenant Hiroharu Sumino
4th Shotai (2xB5N)
VB Leader—Lieutenant Michio Kobayashi (not present - aborted)
21st Shotai (2xD3A)—Lieutenant Kobayashi
22nd Shotai (3xD3A)
23rd Shotai (3xD3A) (one aircraft lost)
24th Shotai (3xD3A)-Lieutenant Shun Nakagawa
25th Shotai (3xD3A)
26th Shotai (3xD3A) (one aircraft lost)
VF Leader—Lieutenant Sumio Nono
4th FCU Wave 1 (6xA6M)—Lieutenant Kiyokuma Okajima
4th FCU Wave 2 (9xA6M)—Lieutenant Nono (one aircraft lost)
CAP (3xA6M)5th Carrier DivisionRear Admiral Chuichi Hara
Shōkaku (Shōkaku-class)—Captain Takatsugu Jōjima
Air Officer—Commander Tetsujiro Wada
VTB Leader—Lieutenant Tatsuo Ichihara
1st Chutai (9xB5N)—Lieutenant Ichihara
2nd Chutai (9xB5N)-Lieutenant Tsutomu Hagiwara
3rd Chutai (9xB5N)-Lieutenant Yoshiaki Ikuin
VB Leader—Lieutenant Commander Kakuichi Takahashi
1st Chutai (9xD3A)—Lieutenant Commander Takahashi
2nd Chutai (8xD3A)-Lieutenant Masao Yamaguchi
3rd Chutai (9xD3A)-Lieutenant Hisayoshi Fujita (one aircraft lost)
VF Leader—Lieutenant Tadashi Kaneko
5th FCU Wave 1 (6xA6M)—Lieutenant Kaneko
CAP (12xA6M)
Zuikaku (Shōkaku-class)—Captain Ichibei Yokokawa
Air Officer—Commander Hisao Shimoda
VTB Leader—Lieutenant Commander Shigekazu Shimazaki
1st Chutai (9xB5N)—Lieutenant Commander Shimazaki
2nd Chutai (9xB5N)-Lieutenant Takemi Iwami
3rd Chutai (9xB5N)-Lieutenant Yoshiaki Tsubota
VB Leader—Lieutenant Akira Sakamoto
1st Chutai (9xD3A)—Lieutenant Sakamoto
2nd Chutai (8xD3A)-Lieutenant Tamotsu Ema
3rd Chutai (8xD3A)-Lieutenant Chikahiro Hayashi
VF Leader—Lieutenant Masao Sato
6th FCU Wave 1 (5xA6M)—Lieutenant Sato
CAP (12xA6M)DD Akigumo (Kagero''-class) 
3rd Battleship Division
Vice Admiral Gunichi MikawaHieiKirishima8th Cruiser Division
Rear Admiral Hiroaki AbeToneChikuma1st Destroyer Squadron
Rear Admiral Sentarō Ōmori
CL Abukuma (Nagara-class)
17th Destroyer Division
 (Kagero-class)Isokaze (Kagero-class)Tanikaze (Kagero-class)Hamakaze (Kagero-class)
18th Destroyer Division
(Detached from DesRon 2)Kagero (Kagero-class)Shiranuhi (Kagero-class)Arare (Asashio-class)Kasumi (Asashio-class)
7th Destroyer Division (Midway Attack Unit)
Captain Ohishi KanameSazanami (Fubuki-class)Ushio (Fubuki-class)
2nd Submarine Division
Captain Kijiro ImaizumiI-19 (I-15-class {Type B1})I-21 (I-15-class/Type B1)I-23 (I-15-class/Type B1)
1st Supply Train 
AO (fleet oiler) Kyokuto Maru (impressed merchantman)
AO Kenyo Maru (impressed merchantman)
AO Kokuyo Maru (impressed merchantman)
AO Shinkoku Maru (impressed merchantman)
AO Akebono Maru (impressed merchantman)
2nd Supply Train 
AO Tōhō Maru (impressed merchantman)
AO Toei Maru (impressed merchantman)
AO Nippon Maru (impressed merchantman)
6th Fleet 
Vice Admiral Mitsumi Shimizu
1st Submarine Squadron
Rear Admiral Tsutomu SatoI-9 (I-9-class {Type A1})I-15 (I-15 class/Type B1)I-17 (I-15 class/Type B1)I-25 (I-15 class/Type B1)
2nd Submarine Squadron
Rear Admiral Shigeaki YamazakiI-7 (I-7 class/Type J3)I-1 (I-1 class/Type J1)I-2 (I-1 class/Type J1)I-3 (I-1 class/Type J1)I-4 (I-1 class/Type J1)I-5 (I-5 class/Type J1M)I-6 (I-6 class/Type J2)
3rd Submarine Squadron 
Rear Admiral Shigeyoshi MiwaI-8 (I-7 class/Type J3)I-68 (I-68 class/Type KD6A)
I-69 (I-68 class/Type KD6A)
I-70 (I-68 class/Type KD6A)
I-71 (I-68 class/Type KD6A)
I-72 (I-68 class/Type KD6A)
I-73 (I-68 class/Type KD6A)
I-74 (I-74 class/Type KD6B)
I-75 (I-74 class/Type KD6B)
Special Attack Unit 
Captain Hankyu Sasaki ("mother" submarines commander)
Lieutenant Naoji Iwasa (midget submarines commander)
I-22 (flag) (I-16-class {Type C1})
I-22A (A type midget submarine)
I-16 (I-16-class {Type C1}) Lt. Cmdr. Hiroshi Hanabusa
I-16A (A type)—Ensign Kazuo Sakamaki (USA's first POW)
I-18 (I-16-class {Type C1})
I-18A (A type)
I-20 (I-16-class {Type C1})
I-20A (A type)
I-24 (I-16-class {Type C1})
I-24A (A type)
Submarine Reconnaissance Unit 
Commander Kashihara Yasuchika
I-10 (I-9 class/Type A1)
I-26 (I-26 class/Type B1) Cmdr Minoru Yokota

United States

Afloat, United States Navy
Chief of Naval Operations
Admiral Harold R. Stark
Commander in Chief, U.S. Fleet / Pacific Fleet
Admiral Husband E. "Kim" Kimmel
Chief of Staff: Captain William W. Smith
Operations Officer & Assistant Chief of Staff: Captain Walter S. DeLany
1st Assistant Operations Officer: Commander Roscoe F. Good
2nd Assistant Operations Officer: Lieutenant Commander Howard L. Collins
War Plans Officer: Captain Charles H. McMorris
Assistant War Plans & Marine Officer: Colonel Omar T. Pfeiffer, USMC
Security Officer: Lieutenant Allan L. Reed
Communications Officer: Commander Maurice E. Curts
Gunnery Officer: Commander Willard A. Kitts
Commandant, 14th Naval District: Rear Admiral Claude C. Bloch
Commander, Navy Pacific Fleet Air Wing: Rear Admiral Patrick N. L. Bellinger
Operations Officer: Captain Logan C. Ramsey 
Battle Force (Task Force 1)
Vice Admiral William S. Pye
Captain Harold C. Train, Chief of Staff
Battleships, Battle Force
RADM Walter S. Anderson
Battleship Division 1
RADM Isaac Campbell Kidd
 (sunk) — Captain Franklin Van Valkenburgh
 — Captain Francis W. Scanland
 (Nevada class) (sunk) — Captain Howard D. "Ping" Bode
Battleship Division 2
RADM William Satterlee Pye
 — Captain Charles M. "Savvy" Cooke, Jr.
 — Captain Charles Edwin Reordan
 (Tennessee class) (sunk, raised, and repaired) —  Captain Joel W. Bunkley
Battleship Division 4
RADM Walter S. Anderson
 — Captain D. C. Godwin
 (Colorado class) (sunk, raised, and repaired) — Captain Mervyn Bennion
 (Colorado class) — Puget Sound Navy Yard undergoing overhaul.
Cruisers, Battle Force
Rear Admiral Herbert Fairfax Leary
Cruiser Division 6 (Partial)

 (New Orleans class)
Cruiser Division 9
Rear Admiral H. Fairfax Leary

 (Brooklyn class)
 — Captain George A. Rood
 (St. Louis class)
Destroyers, Battle Force
Rear Admiral Milo F. Draemel
Destroyer Flotilla 1

Destroyer Squadron 1

Destroyer Division One

 (Farragut class)
 (Farragut class)
 (Farragut class)
Destroyer Division Two
 (Farragut class)
 (Farragut class)
 (Farragut class)
 (Farragut class)
Destroyer Squadron 3
 (Porter class)
Destroyer Division Five

 (Mahan class)
 (Mahan class)
 (Mahan class)
Destroyer Division Six
 (Mahan class)
 (Mahan class)
 (Mahan class) (sunk, raised, and repaired)
 (Mahan class)
Destroyer Flotilla 2
 (Omaha class)
 (Bagley class)
 (Bagley class)
 (Bagley class)
 (Bagley class)
 (Bagley class)
 (Bagley class)
 (Bagley class)
 (Bagley class)
Other Destroyers

 (patrolling Channel entrance to Pearl Harbor)
Task Force 8
Vice Admiral William Halsey Jr.
USS Enterprise (CV-6) 
Scouting Squadron 6 - Lt. Commander H.L. Hopping
18xDouglas SBD Dauntless (6 aircraft lost)
Submarines

Minecraft, Battle Force
Rear admiral William R. Furlong
 (sunk, raised, and repaired)
Minesweepers

Coastal Minesweepers

Destroyer Minelayers

Destroyer Minesweepers

Patrol Gunboat

Destroyer Tenders

Seaplane Tenders

Small Seaplane Tenders

Seaplane Tenders (converted Destroyer)

Ammunition Ship

Oilers

Repair Ships

Submarine Tender

Submarine Rescue Ship

Hospital Ship

Cargo Ship
 (at Honolulu)
Stores Issue Ships

 (entering Pearl Harbor)
Ocean Tugs

 (entering Pearl Harbor)
 ( outside Pearl Harbor entrance)
Miscellaneous Auxiliaries
 (Target ship) (sunk)

 (out of commission)
U.S. Coast Guard
 (at Honolulu)

Ashore, United States Army
Chief of Staff of the Army
General George Catlett Marshall, Jr.
Commanding General, Hawaiian Department
Lieutenant General Walter Campbell Short
Schofield Barracks
Commanding General, 24th Infantry Division
Brigadier General Durward Wilson
19th Infantry Regiment
21st Infantry Regiment
299th Infantry Regiment, Hawaiian Territorial Guard
Commanding General, 25th Infantry Division
Major General Maxwell Murray
27th Infantry Regiment
35th Infantry Regiment
298th Infantry Regiment, Hawaiian Territorial Guard
Hawaiian Coast Artillery Command
Major General Henry Bargin
Hawaiian Separate Coast Artillery Brigade
15th Coast Artillery Regiment
16th Coast Artillery Regiment
41st Coast Artillery Regiment
55th Coast Artillery Regiment
53rd Coast Artillery Brigade
64th Coast Artillery Regiment
97th Coast Artillery Regiment
98th Coast Artillery Regiment
251st Coast Artillery Regiment, California Army National Guard
Commanding General, Hawaiian Air Force
Major General Frederick Martin
Commanding General, 14th Pursuit Wing
Brigadier General Howard Davidson
15th Pursuit Group
45th Pursuit Squadron
46th Pursuit Squadron
47th Pursuit Squadron
72d Pursuit Squadron
18th Air Base Command
18th Pursuit Group
6th Pursuit Squadron
19th Pursuit Squadron
44th Pursuit Squadron
73rd Pursuit Squadron
78th Pursuit Squadron
Commanding General, 18th Bombardment Wing
Brigadier General Jacob Rudolph
5th Bombardment Group
23rd Bombardment Squadron
31st Bombardment Squadron
72d Bombardment Squadron
4th Reconnaissance Squadron
17th Air Base Command
11th Bombardment Group
26th Bombardment Squadron
42d Bombardment Squadron
50th Reconnaissance Squadron

Ashore, United States Marine Corps 
14th Naval District Marine Officer (Col. Harry K. Pickett)
 Marine Barracks Pearl Harbor (Col. Gilder D. Jackson Jr.
 Observer from the Headquarters Marine Corps: Lt. Col. William J. Whaling
 Marine Barracks, Naval Ammunition Depot, Oahu (Maj. Francis M. McAlister)
 1st Defense Battalion (Lt. Col. Bertram A. Bone)
 3rd Defense Battalion (Lt. Col. Robert H. Pepper; acting commander Maj. Harold C. Roberts)
 4th Defense Battalion (Lt. Col. Harold S. Fassett)
 2nd Engineer Battalion  (Lt. Col. Elmer E. Hall)
 Marine Corps Air Station Ewa
 Marine Aircraft Group (MAG-21) (Col. Claude A. Larkin)
 Marine Scout Bomber Squadron 232 (VMSB-232) (Maj. Ira L. Kimes)
 Marine Utility Squadron 252 (VMJ-252) (Maj. Perry K. Smith)
 Marine Fighting Squadron 211 (VMF-211)

References

World War II orders of battle